The Municipality of Paddington was a local government area of Sydney, New South Wales, Australia. The municipality was proclaimed on 17 April 1860 and, with an area of 1.7 square kilometres, included the entire suburb of Paddington and parts of Edgecliff. The council was amalgamated with the City of Sydney to the east with the passing of the Local Government (Areas) Act 1948, although the former council area was transferred in 1968 to the Municipality of Woollahra, transferred to the City of South Sydney in 1989 and was then split in 2003 between the City of Sydney and the Municipality of Woollahra.

Council history and location
The municipality was proclaimed by the Governor of New South Wales, Sir William Denison, on 17 April 1860, bounded by New South Head Road to the north, Jersey Road and Ocean Street to the east, Rushcutters Creek to the northwest and Moore Park to the south. The first nine-member council was declared elected on 23 May 1860. On 25 November 1864, the municipality was divided into three wards: Upper Paddington Ward, Lower Paddington Ward and Glenmore Ward.

In 1889, at the urging of alderman and mayor, Charles Hellmrich, land was acquired on Oxford Street adjoining Victoria Barracks, for a new Town Hall. In early 1890, a design by architect John Edward Kemp was chosen and on 8 November 1890, the foundation stone was laid by Premier Sir Henry Parkes. On 3 October 1891 the new town hall was formally opened by the Governor, The Earl of Jersey.

Following the enactment of the Municipalities Act, 1867, the title of Chairman was renamed "Mayor" and the council became known as the Borough of Paddington (From 28 December 1906, following the passing of the Local Government Act, 1906, the council was again renamed as the "Municipality of Paddington"). The wards were adjusted following a petition on 5 January 1884, adding a fourth ward and renaming two: Upper Ward, Middle Ward, Lower Ward and Glenmore Ward. In July 1907, a proposal by the mayor, Denis Brown, to abolish the ward system was voted down by the council.

By the end of the Second World War, the NSW Government had realised that its ideas of infrastructure expansion could not be realised by the present system of the mostly-poor inner-city municipal councils and the Minister for Local Government, Joseph Cahill, passed a bill in 1948 that abolished a significant number of those councils. Under the Local Government (Areas) Act 1948, Paddington Municipal Council was merged with the larger neighbouring City of Sydney which was located immediately to the west, becoming the Paddington Ward, returning two aldermen, the penultimate and final mayors, Frank Green and Walter Farley Read.

Mayors

References

Paddington
Paddington
Paddington
Paddington